The 2013 Sudirman Cup was the thirteenth tournament of the Sudirman Cup. It was held from May 19–26, 2013 in Kuala Lumpur, Malaysia. According to the Badminton World Federation (BWF) 31 teams have confirmed their participation, for the second time, twelve teams competed in the elite group to battle for the title.

Host city selection
Kuala Lumpur and Melbourne submitted bids for 2013 Sudirman Cup. On 9 December 2011, Badminton World Federation awarded the championships to Kuala Lumpur after Melbourne withdrew its bid and making Kuala Lumpur as the sole candidate.

Seedings
The seedings for teams competing in the tournament were released on March 7, 2013. It was based on aggregated points from the best players in the world ranking. The tournament was divided into three groups (initially four groups, but because of South Africa withdrawn, Philippines and Kazakhstan redrawn to enter Groups 3), with twelve teams in the elite group competing for the title. Eight teams were seeded into second groups and ten teams were seeded into third groups. The draw was held on May 7, 2013.

Group 1

Group 2

Group 3

Group 1

Group stage

Group 1A

Group 1B

Group 1C

Group 1D

|}

Knockout stage
The draw for the quarterfinals was held after the completion of the final matches in the group stage on May 21, 2013.

Bracket

Quarterfinal

Semifinal

Final

Play-offs
The draw for the Play-offs was held on May 30, 2013.

Bracket

Group 2

Group 2A

Group 2B

Play-offs Promotion

Bracket

 will be Promoted to Group 1

Play-offs Relegation

Bracket

 will be relegated to Group 3

Group 3

Group 3A

Group 3B

Playoffs
 1 - 3 

 3 - 0 

2 - 3 

 3 - 1 

 3 - 0

Final standings

References

2013
Sudirman Cup
Sudirman Cup
2013 Sudirman Cup
2013 Sudirman Cup
International sports competitions hosted by Malaysia